American actress Laura Linney has been nominated and won numerous awards throughout her career in film, television, and stage. She has been the recipient of three Academy Award nominations for her performances in Kenneth Lonergan's You Can Count on Me (2000), Bill Condon's Kinsey (2004), and Tamara Jenkins' Savages (2007). She has also received a British Academy Film Award nomination for Best Supporting Actress for her performance in Clint Eastwood's Mystic River (2003). She also received eight Golden Globe Award nominations, winning twice, and nine Screen Actors Guild Awards winning once. She has also received two Independent Spirit Awards.  

For her work on television she received nine Primetime Emmy Award nominations winning four awards for her performances in Wild Iris (2002), Frasier (2004), John Adams (2008), The Big C: Hereafter (2013). For her work on the Broadway stage she has earned five nominations for Best Actress in a Play for her performances in Arthur Miller's The Crucible in 2002, Donald Margulies's Sight Unseen in 2005, and Time Stands Still in 2010, Lillian Hellman's The Little Foxes in 2017, and Elizabeth Strout's My Name Is Lucy Barton in 2020.

Major associations

Academy Awards

BAFTA Awards

Emmy Awards

Golden Globe Awards

Independent Spirit Awards

Screen Actors Guild Awards

Tony Awards

Stage awards

Drama Desk Awards

Evening Standard Theatre Awards

Outer Critics Circle Awards

Theatre World Awards

Critic awards

Boston Society of Film Critics Awards

Chicago Film Critics Association Awards

Critics' Choice Movie Awards

Critics' Choice Television Awards

Film Critics Circle of Australia Awards

London Film Critics Circle Awards

Los Angeles Film Critics Association Awards

National Society of Film Critics Awards

New York Film Critics Circle Awards

Miscellaneous awards

Gotham Awards

National Board of Review

Satellite Awards

Australian Film Institute/AACTA Awards

Gracie Allen Awards

Saturn Awards

Webby Awards

References

External links
 
 

Linney, Laura